Ray Strachey (born Rachel Pearsall Conn Costelloe; 4 June 188716 July 1940) was a British feminist politician, artist and writer.

Early life
Her father was Irish barrister Benjamin "Frank" Conn Costelloe, and her mother was art historian Mary Berenson. She was the elder of the two girls in her family. Her younger sister was Karin Stephen, née Costelloe, who married Adrian Stephen, Virginia Woolf's younger brother, in 1914. Ray was educated at Kensington high school and at Newnham College, Cambridge, where she achieved third class in part one of the mathematical tripos (1908).

Like some other female Mathematics graduates of the time, such as Margaret Dorothea Rowbotham and Margaret Partridge, Strachey developed an interest in engineering. She was discouraged by her mother Mary Berensen but nevertheless she took an electrical engineering class at Oxford University in 1910 and planned to study electrical engineering at the Technical College of the City and Guilds of London Institute in October 1910. She wrote to her aunt "I have decided to go to London next winter for my engineering" and that she had been encouraged and helped by Hertha Ayrton. She abandoned her plan due to marriage, but maintained her involvement with the Society of Women Welders which she had helped to found.

Career

For most of her life, Strachey worked for women's suffrage organisations, starting when she was studying at Cambridge, when she joined what became known as the Mud March in February 1907 and addressing meetings in summer 1907. She took part in the National Union of Women's Suffrage Societies (NUWSS) Caravan tour in July 1908.

Most of Strachey's publications are non-fiction and deal with suffrage issues. She is most often remembered for her book The Cause (1928). Her papers are held at The Women's Library at the London School of Economics.

Strachey worked closely with Millicent Fawcett, sharing her Liberal feminist values and opposing any attempt to integrate the suffrage movement with the Labour Party. In 1915 she became parliamentary secretary of the NUWSS, serving in this role until 1920.

Strachey took great interest in the employment of women in engineering occupations. In 1919 women found themselves excluded by law from most jobs in the engineering industry under the Restoration of Pre-War Practices Act 1919. Strachey campaigned on behalf of the Society of Women Welders in 1920 for women to remain in the trade. In 1922 Strachey also created a company to build small mud houses to help the housing shortage, based on a 1922 prototype known as "Copse Cottage". Women were employed to assemble them but there were problems with sourcing the correct clay and the chimney builders refused to co-operate. The Mavat company did exhibit a bungalow in 1925 at the Women's Arts & Crafts Exhibition at Central Hall in London. Strachey was defeated but she found work for all the women involved.

In her book Women's Suffrage and Women's Service she described the setting up by the London Society for Women's Service of a school for Oxy-Acetylene Welding. In 1937 she wrote about women's employment in professional and trade roles in Careers and Openings for Women.

After the Great War, when some women were granted the vote, and women could stand for parliament, she stood as an Independent parliamentary candidate at Brentford and Chiswick on the General Elections in 1918, 1922 and 1923, without success. She rejected the attempt by Eleanor Rathbone to establish a broad-based feminist programme in the 1920s. In 1931 she became parliamentary secretary to Britain's first woman MP to take her seat, Nancy Astor, Viscountess Astor, and in 1935 Strachey became the head of the Women's Employment Federation. She also made regular radio broadcasts for the BBC.

Family
She married at Cambridge on 31 May 1911 the civil servant Oliver Strachey, with whom she had two children, Barbara (born 1912, later a writer) and Christopher (born 1916, later a pioneer computer scientist).  Oliver Strachey was the elder brother of the biographer Lytton Strachey of the Bloomsbury group; other siblings in the Strachey family included psychoanalyst James Strachey, novelist Dorothy Bussy, educationist Pernel Strachey. Ray's mother-in-law was Jane Maria Strachey, a well-known author and supporter of women's suffrage who co-led the suffragist Mud March of 1907 in London.

Art

Strachey painted her sister-in-law, Pernel Strachey, around the year 1930, and the young Fellow of King's College, Cambridge, Dadie Rylands at about the same time. Both paintings are in the National Portrait Gallery in London.

Death
She died in the Royal Free Hospital in London in her early fifties of heart failure, following an operation to remove a fibroid tumor.

Posthumous recognition
Her name and picture (and those of 58 other women's suffrage supporters) are on the plinth of the statue of Millicent Fawcett in Parliament Square, London, unveiled in April 2018.

Publications
The World at Eighteen
Marching On
Shaken By The Wind

Biographies
Frances Willard: Her Life and Work (1913)
A Quaker Grandmother: Hannah Whitall Smith (1914) 
Millicent Garrett Fawcett (1931)

Non-fiction about women's roles
Women's suffrage and women's service: The history of the London and National Society for Women's Service (1927)
The Cause: a Short History of Women's Movement in Great Britain
Careers and Openings for Women
Our Freedom and Its Results

References

External links
 
 
 Ray Strachey, The Women's Library at London Metropolitan University
 Oxford Dictionary of National Biography

1887 births
1940 deaths
20th-century British novelists
20th-century British women writers
Alumni of Newnham College, Cambridge
British feminist writers
British suffragists
British women novelists
Independent British political candidates
Ray
Writers from London